Model School may refer to:

School type
 Laboratory school, a type of elementary or secondary school used for teacher training

Individual schools

Australia
Several historical school in Adelaide, South Australia, including:
 Currie Street Model School
 Flinders Street Model School
 Grote Street Model School
 Sturt Street Model School

United States
 American Indian Model Schools, a charter school system in Oakland, California
 Model Laboratory School, a demonstration school in Richmond, Kentucky
 Model Secondary School for the Deaf, a part of Gallaudet University campus, Washington, D.C.
 Riverview Hall, a historic laboratory school in St. Cloud, Minnesota, listed on the National Register of Historic Places as the Model School

Other countries

 Sohagpur SK Pilot Model High School, Sirajganj, Bangladesh 
 Model Higher Secondary School, TT Nagar, Bhopal, India
 Model Technical Higher Secondary Schools, a set of secondary schools in Kerala, India
 Government Model Boys Higher Secondary School, Thiruvananthapuram, India
 Model Multiple College, a private educational institution in Ramchowk, Nepal
 Staats Model School, Pretoria, South Africa

See also
 Model High School (disambiguation)
 Mallikoulu, a 2005 Finnish television series (Model School in English)
 National Association of University-Model Schools